Michael Ghil (born 10 June 1944 in Budapest, Hungary) is an American and European mathematician and physicist, focusing on the climate sciences and their interdisciplinary aspects. He is a founder of theoretical climate dynamics, as well as of advanced data assimilation methodology. He has systematically applied dynamical systems theory to planetary-scale flows, both atmospheric and oceanic. Ghil has used these methods to proceed from simple flows with high temporal regularity and spatial symmetry to the observed flows, with their complex behavior in space and time. His studies of climate variability on many time scales have used a full hierarchy of models, from the simplest ‘toy’ models all the way to atmospheric, oceanic and coupled general circulation models. Recently, Ghil has also worked on modeling and data analysis in population dynamics, macroeconomics, and the climate–economy–biosphere system.

He is currently a Distinguished Research Professor at the University of California, Los Angeles and a Distinguished Professor Emeritus at the École Normale Supérieure, Paris.

Early life and education 
Ghil spent his childhood in Romania before moving to Israel. He studied Mechanical Engineering at the Technion–Israel Institute of Technology, Haifa, Israel from where he received his B.Sc. in August 1966, and his M.Sc. in June 1971. He studied Mathematics at the Courant Institute of Mathematical Sciences, New York University, New York from where he received a Master’s in February 1973 and a Ph.D. in June 1975, under the supervision of Peter Lax (Abel Prize 2005). His doctoral dissertation title was “A Nonlinear Parabolic Equation with Applications to Climate Theory".

Career 
Ghil was affiliated with the Courant Institute of Mathematical Sciences, from September 1971 until May 1987, first as a Research Assistant (1971–1975) and then as a Research Professor (1982–1987), via intermediate appointments. While in New York, he was a NAS/NRC Research Associate at the NASA Goddard Institute for Space Studies, New York from August 1975 to September 1976.

In 1985 Ghil was appointed a full professor of Climate Dynamics at the Department of Atmospheric Sciences at the University of California, Los Angeles, where he also served as a Chairman of the same Department from September 1988 to June 1992. From July 1994 until June 2003 he was appointed Distinguished Professor of Climate Dynamics at UCLA, as well as the Director of the Institute of Geophysics & Planetary Physics, UCLA, from July 1992 until June 2003. He served as the Director of the Environmental Research & Teaching Institute (CERES-ERTI), of École Normale Supérieure in Paris from November 2002 until September 2010 and as a Head of the Geosciences Department of ENS from July 2003 until December  2009, where he was also a Distinguished Professor of Geosciences from September 2002 until September 2012.

Since October 2003 until today, he is a Distinguished Research Professor of Atmospheric and Oceanic Sciences at the University of California, Los Angeles. He is also a Distinguished Professor Emeritus at École Normale Supérieure, Paris from September 2012.

Research 
Ghil has played an important role in the foundations of modern theoretical climate dynamics. During the late 1970s, he worked in the application of dynamical systems theory to problems of the climate sciences. Starting from the work of Budyko and Sellers, Ghil proposed a 1D Energy Balance Model able to provide a succinct but essentially correct description of the climate system. Ghil’s analysis complemented the ones by Budyko and Sellers and played a key role for understanding the multistability of the Earth system, which features competing snowball and warm states. Paleoclimatological evidence that the Earth had indeed experienced snowball episodes in the Pre-Cambrian emerged in the 1990s. Energy balance models like Ghil’s, once supplemented with stochastic forcings (along the direction of Hasselmann’s programme) led to the discovery of phenomena like stochastic resonance.

Throughout the 1980s and 1990s Ghil contributed to the development of data assimilation techniques in meteorology and oceanography, and to the theory of low-frequency variability of the atmosphere (with a special emphasis on the study of blocking), as well as to the understanding of large-scale ocean dynamics. He introduced the use of advanced spectral methods for the analysis of chaotic geophysical time series, and most prominently the singular-spectrum analysis technique (SSA). In the 2000s, he extended his studies of the El Niño-Southern Oscillation phenomenon (ENSO) using Boolean delay and delay differential equations, and worked on the statistics and dynamics of extreme events. Recently, Ghil proposed the pullback attractor as a mathematical framework able to encompass the random and time-dependent nature of the climate system. Another area of research has been the development of data-driven methods for reconstructing the surrogate dynamics of partially observed systems. Additionally, he has contributed to data analysis and modeling in macroeconomics and population dynamics, as well as to coupled climate-economy-biosphere modeling.

Honors and awards 
 2022 American Physical Society Fellow
 2012 A. Wegener Medal & Honorary Member, European Geosciences Union (EGU)
 2010 Honorary Member, Hungarian Academy of Sciences
 2005 Lorenz Lecture, American Geophysical Union
 2005 Foreign Member, Austrian Academy of Sciences (OeAW)
 2004 L. F. Richardson Medal, European Geosciences Union
 2002 Honorary Fellow of the Royal Astronomical Society
 1998 Member, Academia Europaea
1995 Fellow, American Geophysical Union
 1991 - 1992 Guggenheim Fellow
 1988 Fellow, American Meteorological Society

Publications 
A selection of books and papers is given below.

Selected books 
 Bengtsson, L., M. Ghil, and E. Källén (Eds.), 1981: Dynamic Meteorology: Data Assimilation Methods, Springer-Verlag, New York/Heidelberg/Berlin, doi:10.1007/978-1-4612-5970-1, reissued as an eBook by Springer in 2012, e-ISBN 978-1-4612-5970-1, 330 pp.
 Ghil, M., R. Benzi, and G. Parisi (Eds.), 1985: Turbulence and Predictability in Geophysical Fluid Dynamics and Climate Dynamics, Proceedings of the International School of Physics “Enrico Fermi", Course LXXXVIII, Varenna, 1985, North-Holland Publ. Co., Amsterdam/New York/Tokyo, 449 pp.
 Ghil, M., and S. Childress, 1987: Topics in Geophysical Fluid Dynamics: Atmospheric Dynamics, Dynamo Theory and Climate Dynamics, Springer Science & Business Media, pp, doi:10.1007/978-1-4612-1052-8, ISBN 978-0-387-96475-l, reissued as an eBook by Springer in 2012, ISBN 978-1-4612-1052-8, pp. xv + 485.

Selected papers 
Theory of Climate Dynamics and Climate Variability

 Ghil, M., 1976: Climate stability for a Sellers-type model, J. Atmos. Sci., 33, 3–20.
 Ghil, M., and R. Vautard, 1991: Interdecadal oscillations and the warming trend in global temperature time series, Nature, 350, 324–327.
 Ghil, M., M. D. Chekroun, and E. Simonnet, 2008: Climate dynamics and fluid mechanics: Natural variability and related uncertainties, Physica D, 237, 2111–2126, doi:10.1016/j.physd.2008.03.036.
 Ghil, M., 2019: A century of nonlinearity in the geosciences, Earth & Space Science, 6, 1007–1042, doi: 10.1029/2019EA000599.
 Ghil, M., and V. Lucarini, 2020: The physics of climate variability and climate change, Rev. Mod. Phys., 92(3), 035002, doi:10.1103/RevModPhys.92.035002.

Paleoclimate

 Källén, E., C. Crafoord and M. Ghil, 1979: Free oscillations in a climate model with ice-sheet dynamics, J. Atmos. Sci., 36, 2292–2303, https://doi.org/10.1175/1520-0469(1979)036%3C2292:FOIACM%3E2.0.CO;2
 Ghil, M., 1994: Cryothermodynamics: The chaotic dynamics of paleoclimate, Physica D, 77, 130–159, doi: 10.1016/0167-2789(94)90131-7.
 Boers, N., M. Ghil and T. Stocker, 2022: Theoretical and paleoclimatic evidence for abrupt transitions in the Earth system, Envir. Res. Lett., 17, 093006, doi: 10.1088/1748-9326/ac8944.

Data assimilation

 Ghil, M. and P. Malanotte-Rizzoli, 1991: Data assimilation in meteorology and oceanography, Adv. Geophys., 33, 141–266.
 Carrassi, A., M. Ghil, A. Trevisan and F. Uboldi, 2008: Data assimilation as a nonlinear dynamical systems problem: Stability and convergence of the prediction-assimilation system, Chaos, 18(2), 023112, doi: 10.1063/1.2909862.

Blockings

 Legras, B., and M. Ghil, 1985: Persistent anomalies, blocking and variations in atmospheric predictability, J. Atmos. Sci., 42, 433–471.

Dynamical Systems Theory

 Chekroun, M. D., E. Simonnet, and M. Ghil, 2011: Stochastic climate dynamics: Random attractors and time-dependent invariant measures, Physica D, doi:10.1016/j.physd.2011.06.005.
 Ghil, M., 2017: The wind-driven ocean circulation: Applying dynamical systems theory to a climate problem, Discr. Cont. Dyn. Syst. – A, 37(1), 189–228, doi:10.3934/dcds.2017008.
 Charó, G. D., M. D. Chekroun, D. Sciamarella, and M. Ghil, 2021: Noise-driven topological changes in chaotic dynamics, Chaos, 31(10), doi:10.1063/5.0059461.
Macroeconomics & coupled climate-macroeconomics

 Hallegatte, S., and M. Ghil, 2008: Natural disasters impacting a macroeconomic model with endogenous dynamics, Ecological Economics, 68, 582–592, doi:10.1016/j.ecolecon.2008.05.022.
 Groth, A., and M. Ghil, 2017: Synchronization of world economic activity, Chaos, 27, 127002 (18 pp.), doi: 10.1063/1.5001820.

References

Living people
University of California, Los Angeles faculty
American geophysicists
Academic staff of the École Normale Supérieure
Technion – Israel Institute of Technology alumni
Courant Institute of Mathematical Sciences alumni
Fellows of the American Meteorological Society
Fellows of the American Geophysical Union
1944 births